Marion Ethel Greig (born February 22, 1954) is an American rower who competed in the 1976 Summer Olympics.

Greig was born in Hudson, New York. She graduated in 1976 from Cornell University. 

She competed in the 1976 Summer Olympics and was a crew member of the American boat which won the bronze medal in the eights event. She rowed in the fifth seat. Greig also competed in the 1975 World Championships in the quad sculls, placing fifth.

References 

1954 births
Living people
Rowers at the 1976 Summer Olympics
Olympic bronze medalists for the United States in rowing
American female rowers
Medalists at the 1976 Summer Olympics
21st-century American women